GPR 120 is a G protein-coupled receptor (GPCR) and the putative receptor for omega-3 fatty acids including Docosahexaenoic acid (DHA) and Eicosapentaenoic acid (EPA). GPR 120 was among a number of free fatty acid receptors only recently discovered from the human genome database utilizing the GPCR deorphanizing strategy. Binding to the GPR 120 receptor is one of the many putative mechanisms of action for the potential health benefits of consuming omega-3 fatty acids. GPR 120 has specifically shown a role in the in-vivo anti-inflammatory and insulin-sensitizing effects of DHA and EPA in macrophages. Macrophage mediated inflammation is a key player in the pathophysiology of metabolic syndrome related disorders, including diabetes and atherosclerosis. GPR 120 is also a key regulator of adipogenesis, including adipocyte development and differentiation.

References 

G protein-coupled receptors